James Donahue may refer to:
 James Donahue (athlete), American pentathlete
 James Paul Donahue Jr., heir to the Woolworth estate and New York City socialite
 James F. Donahue, American merchant and politician from New York
 Jim Donahue, American Major League Baseball player